Hypercompe cotyora is a moth of the family Erebidae first described by Herbert Druce in 1884. It is found in Costa Rica and Panama.

References

cotyora
Moths described in 1884